This is a list of commemorative coins issued by the Philippines. More info here.

Pre-60's

1960's

1970's

1980's

1990's

2010’s - 2020's
On December 9, 2011, the Bangko Sentral ng Pilipinas (BSP) issued a commemorative one-peso coin in celebration of the 150th Birth Anniversary of José Rizal. The coins are in the same dimensions as the circulating one peso coins with Rizal's face from the front instead of in profile. The new coin also has the new logo of the central bank and is legal tender with the current series.

On December 18, 2013, the Bangko Sentral ng Pilipinas issued a commemorative ten-peso coin in celebration of the 150th Birth Anniversary of Andres Bonifacio. The coins are in the same dimensions, but the design changed. These also featured the new logo of the central bank and is also legal tender.

On December 22, 2014, the BSP issued three commemorative coins, a five-peso coin to commemorate the 70th anniversary of the Leyte Gulf Landings, a five-peso coin honoring Overseas Filipinos with the theme "Bagong Bayani" and a ten-peso coin celebrating the 150th anniversary of the birth of Apolinario Mabini.

On January 14, 2015, the BSP issued two limited edition commemorative coins for the papal visit of Pope Francis, a 50-peso coin made of nickel-brass steel and a 500-peso coin made of Nordic gold with gold plating. A special logo with the theme "Mercy and Compassion" was minted on the reverse side of both coins, following the Pope's papal bull of indiction proclaimed later that year to mark the Extraordinary Jubilee of Mercy. The coins are minted under a licensing agreement with the Vatican. Both coins are legal tender. Production and issuance of two additional silver and gold coins in 1000-peso and 10,000-peso denominations were called off due to limitations in the procurement process.

On December 21, 2015, the BSP issued a commemorative 10-peso coin in honor of General Miguel Malvar, in time for the 150th year birth anniversary.

On January 27, 2017, the BSP issued a commemorative one-peso coin in honor of the Philippines' Chairmanship of the Association of Southeast Asian Nations (ASEAN).

In August and November 2017, the BSP issued commemorative one-peso coins and 10-peso coin both honoring the centennial anniversary of the birth of educator and historian Horacio de la Costa and the 150th anniversary of the birth of three officers of the Philippine Revolutionary Army, Generals Artemio Ricarte, Isidoro Torres and Antonio Luna.

In 2018 and 2019, the Bangko Sentral ng Pilipinas issued commemorative coins in commemoration of the anniversary of the Bangko Sentral ng Pilipinas, two 500-peso silver coins, with one commemorating the 25th anniversary of the formation of the current Bangko Sentral ng Pilipinas and one commemorating 70 Years of Central Banking in the Philippines (in reference to the formal establishment of the original Central Bank of the Philippines/Bangko Sentral ng Pilipinas in 1949). A 10,000 peso gold coin was also issued to commemorate 70 years of Central Banking in the Philippines.

On March 11, 2022, the BSP issued a commemorative 125-peso coin to honor the 125th martyrdom anniversary of Dr. Jose Rizal.

References

Currencies of Asia
Philippines
Philippines history-related lists